Gary station was a railway station in Gary, Indiana. It was located at 5th and Chase Streets, initially serving the Pennsylvania Railroad.

History
Gary first appeared on Pennsylvania Railroad time cards on June 23, 1907, a year after the town was founded. It was served by several of the railroad's named trains, including the Liberty Limited, General, Trail Blazer, Manhattan Limited, and Admiral.

Amtrak took over most passenger rail operations in 1971, but the Calumet continued to be operated by Penn Central Transportation (the successor to the Pennsylvania Railroad) until 1979. That same year, the Broadway Limited was rerouted around Gary. The Capitol Limited was inaugurated in 1981, which reinstated intercity services to the station. However, Gary was again dropped on April 28, 1985. Amtrak service ceased entirely after May 3, 1991 when the Calumet was discontinued.

See also

Union Station (Gary, Indiana) — former joint Baltimore and Ohio Railroad and New York Central Railroad depot
Adam Benjamin Metro Center — modern South Shore Line station in Gary

References

Former Pennsylvania Railroad stations
Former Amtrak stations in Indiana
Railway stations in the United States opened in 1907
Railway stations closed in 1991
Railway stations in Lake County, Indiana
Buildings and structures in Gary, Indiana
Demolished railway stations in the United States
Transportation in Gary, Indiana